Katelyn Pippy (born April 12, 1993) is an American actress, producer, and production manager, best known for her role as Emmalin Holden on the Lifetime television drama Army Wives.

Career 
The role of Emmalin Holden on Army Wives, was played by Caroline Pires in season one but filled by Pippy prior to season two, after producers determined an actress with more robust training would be needed for the emotional arc of the character following the death of Emmalin's older sister, Amanda (played by Kim Allen), in a bar bombing. In seasons three and four, Pippy was a member of the cast member, contracted to appear in a minimum of ten episodes per thirteen-episodes produced. Pippy balanced the February-to-August shooting schedule in Charleston, South Carolina, with her high school education by keeping up with class work online and managed to keep playing ice hockey at an elite level by flying wherever her team was scheduled to play on weekends. After enrolling at Cornell University in 2011, she reduced her episode commitment in order to focus on her studies, continuing in role as a guest star for the remaining three seasons. Emmalin, like Pippy, also played ice hockey at college.

She was most recently cast in Azi Rahman's feature directorial debut Whisper, a “dark ode to modern love and Los Angeles.”

Personal life
Pippy was born on April 12, 1993, at Fort Hood, Texas, where her father served on active duty with the 1st Cavalry Division of the United States Army. She is the daughter of former political operative and lobbyist Kathy Pippy and politician John Pippy, a member of the Pennsylvania State Senate from 2003 to 2012. Her paternal grandmother, Pensri, is Thai. 

Pippy's hometown is Moon Township, Pennsylvania, and she is a graduate of Lincoln Park Performing Arts Charter School in Midland, Pennsylvania. She enrolled at Cornell University in 2011 and graduated with a Bachelor of Arts in Theater in 2015.

Filmography

Ice hockey career

Pippy played ice hockey as a goaltender in the Tier 1 Elite Hockey League (T1EHL) with the Pittsburgh Jr. Penguins, on the under-16 (U16) team in the 2008–09 and 2009–10 seasons, and with the under-19 (U19) team in the 2010–11 season. She participated in several USA Hockey National Selection Camps in the summer of 2011. 

In fall 2011, she joined the Cornell Big Red women's ice hockey program as the third goaltender, backing up more seasoned netminders Amanda Mazzotta and Lauren Slebodnick. The 2011–12 Cornell Big Red roster featured a significant number of top Canadian and American talents, including forwards Jessica Campbell, Emily Fulton, Brianne Jenner, Rebecca Johnston, Jill Saulnier, Catherine White, and defencemen Laura Fortino, Alyssa Gagliardi, and Lauriane Rougeau. The 2012–13 season saw Pippy's first NCAA start, a shutout against Colgate on November 17.

Regular season and playoff statistics

References

External links 
 
 

1993 births
Living people
Actresses from Pennsylvania
American child actresses
American television actresses
American people of Thai descent
People from Moon Township, Allegheny County, Pennsylvania
People from Fort Hood, Texas
Cornell Big Red women's ice hockey players
American women's ice hockey goaltenders